Snehapoorvam Anna is a 2000 Malayalam romantic film starring Vaibhavi Merchant and Innocent. It was written by Hari Kumar and directed by Sangeeth Sivan. The film concerns the relationship between a father and his daughter.

Plot
Anna is her father's only daughter. He has the dream of marrying her to someone according to his wish. However, she falls in love with a boy and this shakes the relationship between the daughter and father.

Cast
 Vaibhavi Merchant as Anna
 Subil (Kukku) Surendran as Jomon
 Innocent as Anna's Father
 Cochin Haneefa as Abu Uncle
 Bindu Panicker as Fousi Aunty
 Captain Raju as Jomon's Father
 Reena as Jomon's Mother
 Nandhu as College Student
 Sudheesh as College Student
 Sandra Jose as College Student

Soundtrack
The film score and soundtrack of the film were composed by Raju Singh, with lyrics by Shibu Chakravarthy. The film had eight songs, of which six were picturised.

 "Aaru nee en hridayakavaadam" - M. G. Sreekumar	
 "Akkare Veettil Anthonichanu" - M. G. Sreekumar, Biju Narayanan, Sujatha	
 "Karukappulmettile" - M. G. Sreekumar, Sujatha		
 "Maaleyam Maarilezhum" - Sreenivas, K. S. Chithra
 "Maanthalirin" - M. G. Sreekumar, K. S. Chithra		
" Maanthalirin [M]" - K. J. Yesudas, Raju Singh	
 "Ooadaan (Rap)" - Biju Narayanan, Chorus		
 "Ormayil Ennormayil [F]" - Sujatha Mohan

References

External links
 

2000s Malayalam-language films
2000s romance films
2000 films
Films directed by Sangeeth Sivan
Indian romance films